Augustus Stafford (22 June 1811 – 15 November 1857), also known as Augustus Stafford O'Brien-Stafford, was a British landowner and Conservative Party politician.

Biography
Stafford was born in Walcot, Lincolnshire in 1811. He was the son of Stafford O'Brien and his wife Emma, daughter of Sir Gerard Noel, 2nd Baronet. His name initially was Augustus Stafford O'Brien.

He sat as a Member of Parliament for Northamptonshire North from 1841 until his early death in 1857. He was Secretary to the Admiralty under the Duke of Northumberland in Lord Derby's 1852 government.

He was an active member of the Canterbury Association which he joined on 27 March 1848. He died on 15 November 1857 in Dublin, Ireland.

References

External links 
 

1811 births
1857 deaths
Conservative Party (UK) MPs for English constituencies
UK MPs 1841–1847
UK MPs 1847–1852
UK MPs 1852–1857
Members of the Canterbury Association